"Blood All on It" is a song by American rapper Gucci Mane, featuring vocals from fellow American rappers Key Glock and Young Dolph. It was released through Atlantic Records and 1017 Records as a single on April 1, 2022. The song serves as Dolph's first posthumous feature. It debuted at number 98 on the US Billboard Hot 100 and number 32 on the Hot R&B/Hip-Hop Songs chart.

Background
Mane paid tribute to Dolph on his 2021 track, "Long Live Dolph", from his compilation album, So Icy Christmas, rapping: "R.I.P. to Dolph, long, long live the legend / From Memphis to the 6, they felt you in the bricks / The day you died, it broke my heart, a day I won't forget / One thing you know, you're missed, one thing you know, we pissed".

Critical reception
Dolph's appearance on the track was heavily praised by several music critics, including Tom Breihan of Stereogum, who felt that "all three rappers on the song find the pocket and sound confident as all hell" and "the Dolph on this track is the kind of Dolph that I want to remember". Writing for Revolt, Jon Powell felt that Dolph makes the song a "bittersweet" collaboration that sees the three artists rap about their riches, their choice in women, and take shots at their haters.

Music video
The official music video for "Blood All on It" premiered alongside the release of the song on April 1, 2022. It sees the three artists rapping and dancing.

It includes cameo appearances from artists who are signed to Dolphs record label, Paper Route Entertainment, including Kenny Muney and Snupe Bandz.

Credits and personnel
 Gucci Mane – lead vocals, songwriting
 Key Glock – featured vocals, songwriting
 Young Dolph – featured vocals, songwriting
 BandPlay – production, songwriting
 Doughboy Beatz – production, songwriting
 Eddie "eMIX" Hernandez – mixing
 Amani "A $" Hernandez – mixing assistance
 Colin Leonard – mastering

Charts

References

2022 singles
2022 songs
Gucci Mane songs
Key Glock songs
Young Dolph songs
Songs written by Gucci Mane
Atlantic Records singles